Chen Yajun (born 9 April 1999) is a Chinese footballer who currently plays for Guangzhou R&F in the Chinese Super League.

Club career
Chen Yajun signed his first professional contract with Chinese Super League side Guangzhou R&F on 17 November 2017. He was promoted to the first team squad by Dragan Stojković in the 2018 season. On 6 April 2018, he made his debut for the club in a 2–0 home loss to Jiangsu Suning, coming on as a substitute for Lu Lin in the 87th minute.

Career statistics 
.

References

External links
 

1999 births
Living people
Chinese footballers
Footballers from Zhanjiang
Guangzhou City F.C. players
Chinese Super League players
Association football midfielders
Guangzhou Sport University alumni